West Point is a ghost town in Rush County, Kansas, United States.

History
West Point was issued a post office in 1878. The post office was discontinued in 1894.

References

Further reading

External links
 Rush County maps: Current, Historic, KDOT

Former populated places in Rush County, Kansas
Former populated places in Kansas